Anna Biller is an American filmmaker who wrote and directed the feature films Viva (2007) and The Love Witch (2016). Biller considers herself a feminist filmmaker and consciously explores feminist themes throughout her work, including exploring the female gaze in cinema. She is vocal on both her website and in interviews about gender inequalities in the film industry.

Early life
Biller was born in Los Angeles to a Japanese-American mother who is a fashion designer and a white father who is a visual artist. She grew up watching her mother design clothes, watching her father paint with a bright color palette, and watching classic cinema, all of which has had a big influence on her filmmaking practice. She has a B.A. in art from UCLA and an MFA in art and film from the California Institute of the Arts, where she studied under Morgan Fisher and Paul McCarthy. She started making 8 mm films while she was living in New York, and at CalArts she studied both art and film and began making 16 mm films.

Career
At the beginning of her career, Biller was known for her short films and staged musicals, which played with old Hollywood genres and tropes from the 1930s to the 1950s. She made her first short film, Three Examples of Myself as Queen, while studying at CalArts. In the film, Biller plays Pointsettia, a teenager who turns into a princess and has the power to transform men into dogs. The film screened at small venues and film festivals. Lane Relyea of Artforum International wrote "the film's humor and graceful perplexity may not have caused any sudden shifts in the local fault lines but did crack a glorious smile on this audience member's face." John Hartl of The Seattle Times called it a "bizarre, Warholian musical fantasy."

In 2001, she directed two short films: The Hypnotist, a melodrama written by her frequent collaborator Jared Sanford, and A Visit from the Incubus, a Western horror musical. A Visit from the Incubus tells the story of a woman who is raped by an incubus, and decides to get back at him by challenging him to a singing competition. Robert Nott of The Santa Fe New Mexican called it a "must-see".

Her 2007 debut feature film, Viva, tells the story of a bored housewife who goes out in search of sexual adventure in the 1970s. It premiered at the International Film Festival Rotterdam, and won the Best of Fest Award at the Boston Underground Film Festival. The film was also entered into the main competition at the 29th Moscow International Film Festival. Reason magazine called Viva an "uncannily precise rendition of the look, sound, mood, and arch dialogue" of seventies sexploitation films, with "high-key, pseudo-Technicolor lighting and spare, colorful set design." Viva had a very limited theatrical release.

Biller's second feature film, The Love Witch, premiered in 2016 at the International Film Festival Rotterdam. The film is a twist on classic serial killer films, featuring a woman who kills through calculated sexuality and "love magic," causing her male victims to fall too much in love. It evokes the sexploitation of women in Hammer horror films, and was shot entirely on film in order to recreate the old Hollywod style. The film took Biller seven years to complete because of her attention to detail in directing, writing, costume and set design, and work with her cinematographer.

Richard Brody of The New Yorker said of The Love Witch, "Biller puts genre to the test of do-it-yourself artistry, and puts feminist ideology itself to the test of style. The film pulsates with furious creative energy throughout, sparking excitement and giddy amazement that it even exists." In May 2016, The Love Witch was acquired for distribution by Oscilloscope Laboratories. The Love Witch was included in many lists for the best films of 2016, including those of The New Yorker and IndieWire. It won in a tie for the Trailblazer Award and Best Costume Design at the Chicago Indie Critics Awards, and also won the Michael Cimino Best Film Award at the American Independent Film Awards.

In 2019, she became a member of the Academy of Motion Picture Arts and Sciences.

Biller has said that her next film will be a Bluebeard story. Biller states "I want to make this film because I have a yearning to see more quality films for women, like the ones that were made in Hollywood’s golden age."

On December 5, 2021, Biller announced she had completed her first novel, Bluebeard's Castle. The book is set for publication in fall 2023 by Verso Books.

Personal life
Biller lives in Los Angeles with her boyfriend, author Robert Greene.

Filmography
Biller served as director, producer, writer, editor, production designer, and costume designer on all films listed.

References

External links

Biller's blog

American film editors
American women film editors
Screenwriters from California
Feminist artists
Living people
American women film directors
American film directors of Japanese descent
Film directors from Los Angeles
Horror film directors
Year of birth missing (living people)
Feminist musicians
21st-century American women